Mike Bettiga (born September 10, 1950) is a former American football wide receiver. He played for the San Francisco 49ers in 1974.

References

1950 births
Living people
American football wide receivers
Humboldt State Lumberjacks football players
San Francisco 49ers players